Brendan O'Sullivan is a former hurler with Kerry and Ballyheigue.

Intercounty career
Brendan O'Sullivan was a member of the Kerry senior hurling team during the 1990s and 2000s. He was a member of the Kerry team with beat Waterford in the 1993 Munster Senior Hurling Championship Kerry's first win in the Championship since 1926. He was still part of the team that lost the 2003 National Hurling League Final to Antrim and that made it to the 4th round of the qualifiers only to lose out to Limerick. He captained Kerry to Div 2 league in 1998 when Kerry beat Westmeath. He won a second League Medal in 2001 when Kerry beat Westmeath in the final. He also won a Railway Cup with Munster in 1996 to date the last Kerry man to do so.

Club

Kerry Senior Hurling Championships 4: 1992, 1996, 1997, 2000

Inter-provincial

Railway Cup 1: 1996

References

Kerry inter-county hurlers
Ballyheigue hurlers
Munster inter-provincial hurlers
Living people
Year of birth missing (living people)